"I Love You... Te Quiero" is the fourth and final single from the Spanish born-Mexican singer Belinda, featuring Cuban-American rapper Pitbull, from her fourth studio album Catarsis. It was released on radio on January 22, 2014 by Capitol Latin.

Background 
"I Love You... Te Quiero" was announced as the fourth single by Belinda via her Twitter account. The song was released to radio stations globally in late January 2014.

Composition 
The single is a powerful Spanglish pop-dance production with a dose of electronic sounds and dubstep. "I Love You... Te Quiero" is co-written by Belinda, Pitbull, "Gavriel “Vein" Aminov, José Ignacio Peregrín, Paolo Prudencio and Lavi "Lavi Beats" Hoss. The song was produced by Vein and Lavi Beats.

Video 
The official video was released on June 25, 2014 on Belinda's VEVO official account, and released on iTunes the same day. The video was directed by Ernesto Yáñez and filmed in Zacatecas city in March 2014. Nearly two million pesos were invested in the video, exceeding her last production "En la Obscuridad".

Chart performance

Release dates

References 

2014 singles
Spanish-language songs
Belinda Peregrín songs
Pitbull (rapper) songs
Songs written by Pitbull (rapper)
Songs written by Belinda Peregrín
Dance-pop songs
2013 songs
Capitol Latin singles